Phon-Ek Maneekorn Jensen (born 30 May 2003) is a Thai professional footballer who plays as a left back for Thai League 3 club Pattaya Dolphins United.

References

External links
 

2003 births
Living people
Phon-Ek Jensen
Association football fullbacks
Phon-Ek Jensen
Phon-Ek Jensen
Phon-Ek Jensen
Phon-Ek Jensen